Charles Arms Carleton (May 27, 1836 – April 1, 1897) was a Union Army major during the American Civil War and a lieutenant colonel and assistant adjutant-general at the end of the war, who was nominated in 1868 and confirmed in 1869 as a brevet brigadier general of volunteers.

Carleton began the war as a private with the 12th New York State Militia, a 3-month regiment, and on September 18, 1861 was appointed a first lieutenant and adjutant with the 4th New Hampshire Volunteer Infantry. He was a lieutenant colonel and assistant adjutant-general for Brigadier General Adelbert Ames from July 8, 1865 to August 1, 1865. He was mustered out of the volunteers on December 19, 1865.

On December 8, 1868, President Andrew Johnson nominated Carleton for appointment to the grade of brevet brigadier general of volunteers, to rank from March 13, 1865, and the United States Senate confirmed the appointment on February 16, 1869.

Charles A. Carleton died on April 26, 1892 at New York City. He was interred at the Evergreen Cemetery (Brooklyn, New York City).

See also

List of American Civil War brevet generals (Union)

References

External links

Union Army officers
1836 births
1897 deaths